The Geoff Show was a humorous radio program, broadcast on Absolute Radio (formerly Virgin Radio) from 3 January 2006 to 25 September 2008. 

The show ran for three hours, between 10pm and 1am, Monday to Thursday. Presented by Geoff Lloyd, it also featured his 'symposium', comprising himself, Annabel Port and his producer Nelson Kumah. A daily podcast of the previous night's show was also produced.  

During the introductions of each of these podcasts, Geoff read out dedications sent in by listeners.  Those who send letters through the post were rewarded with a Geoff Show badge, which were handmade by Annabel Port (shown at right).

On the podcast of the 11 December 2007 show, it was announced that Tony would be leaving his position as producer to take a promotion elsewhere within Absolute Radio.  His replacement, Nelson Kumah began on 7 January 2008.

As part of the re-brand to Absolute Radio, Geoff moved to Geoff Lloyd's Hometime Show, in the afternoon slot. On 16 September 2008 he announced that the Geoff Show was going to end on Thursday 25 September 2008 .

Features that ran until the final show
Podications: Every Podcast was dedicated to listeners who contacted the show in a 'podication'. This was not broadcast on air, but recorded immediately after the show and appeared at the start of each podcast.
Phone In topics: Topics were suggested by Geoff, Annabel and Nelson, normally illustrated by an example. Listeners contacted the station with their ideas, views and experiences. There was also a standing list of 101 different topics on the website.
Porting Controversy: A humorous, self-opinionated debate against widely held beliefs by Annabel, such as 'The Mona Lisa is a good piece of artwork' and 'Reading is fun'.
Drunk Versus Stoned: A quiz in which someone who had been drinking alcohol competes with another listener who had been smoking cannabis in order to win a prize, not to reward them for their activity, but to give them an alternative. This was to examine the detrimental effects of cannabis and alcohol. In the last Geoff Show on 25 September 2008, the scores of the 'Drunk Versus Stoned' game was Stoned with 1 more win than drunks.
The Big 'I Am...': Listeners had to complete the sentence 'I am...' with whatever they were doing or thinking, and Annabel Port read out the texts every night.
Annabel's Letter: Where Annabel writes an open letter to a famous person and gives them career or relationship advice.
Nelson's Special Offers: The closeout feature of the show where listeners would either text or email in with either a name of a city/town in the British Isles or a type of business (keycutters, Indian restaurant etc.) and Nelson had to procure a discount for Geoff Show listeners at that place in that city/town.

Former features
The Dead of the Night: A competition in which Tony describes a dead person's life and the listeners, along with Geoff and Annabel, guess the way in which he dies. Originally the prize was a CD accompanied with an audio book. Now the prize ranges from sexual toys to CD packs.
The Shitting Forecast: In an attempt to topple the shipping forecast in the late night ratings, listeners called in to tell Geoff what they had to eat that day and Annabel predicted how their bowel movement would be the following morning. This was taken off the air as the quality of the callers had decreased and it did not topple BBC Radio 4. Traditionally, when Geoff asked the caller whether their bowel movements were regular, the caller would reply "I'm as regular as clockwork, Geoff!"
The Dirty Book at Bedtime: An erotic story read by Annabel Port.
What the Hell are we going to do on Monday night's show?: A feature on Thursday nights, where three options were given for a one-off feature for the next Monday. Examples include 'Strong thong', 'hackney cab vs acne lad' and 'mop gear'.
A game with a fellow DJ: Geoff talks to the presenter who succeeds The Geoff Show and plays a game with them. Robin Burke's game is entitled "Rocking Robin" and his theme is the Michael Jackson song of the same name. Geoff asks Robin a question about himself. The twist comes when Robin is not presenting his regular show. In that case, Geoff asks the replacement presenter a question about Robin's personality and they have to estimate the answer from what they know about Robin. When Steve Harris presents the following show, the game is entitled "Call My Band" – Steve reads out three band names, two of which are not real bands. The Symposium have to try to guess which is the real band name. Steve's theme is the theme tune from Call My Bluff. Greg Burns's game is "Chinese Burns", where Geoff explains to the listeners that he suspects China is soon to be the dominant world power. Geoff then asks Greg a question concerning China, 'in an effort to discover more about our Chinese masters'.
Night fever: Tony, the patient, gives the symptoms of a well known illness to the doctors, Annabel and Geoff, who do not know what it is and the listeners call in and diagnose Tony. The prize for a correct diagnosis is the Operation board game and a first aid kit.
You Say It's Your Birthday, It's My Birthday Too, Yeah!: This is a weekly competition that takes place on a Wednesday in which Geoff goes head to head with a caller that "dares to take on the mighty Geoff", usually threatening to "geoffocate" on them. The caller has the choice of what subject both they and Geoff will answer questions on. Geoff goes out of the recording studio room and the caller answers as many questions right as they can. Geoff then takes his turn to answer the same questions. Geoff has to answer more questions correctly than the caller if he is to win the prize. If there is a draw, the caller wins the prize and Geoff feels cheated as he "didn't answer any less amount of questions than the caller-in did". The prize for the winner is an item from the show's sponsor "i want one of those.com".
The Sensual Olympics: For five weeks, every Wednesday, a Sensual Olympics event takes place between Geoff, Annabel, Nelson and a person from the wider symposium. There was one event for each of the five senses. The first event of the sense of smell was on 27 February 2008 where Annabel Port came first, followed by the wider symposium representative Mark Forsythe, Nelson Kumah coming third, and Geoff Lloyd in last place. The second event on 7 March 2008 was based on eyesight. Geoff came last yet again because of his strong prescription glasses, Nelson retaining his third position, Annabel dropping to second, with the representative of the wider symposium for the second event, Garry Potter winning. The hearing test on 13 March 2008 was won by Nelson, followed by Geoff second, Annabel coming third and the representative of the wider symposium, Charlee Brown coming last.

Other special features

Roddy Frame of Aztec Camera appeared on the show on 27 April 2006, giving an interview and short performance.
Al Murray once hosted a special of "Drunk vs. Stoned".A 'Sexpert' giving advice before Valentine's Day.Three exclusive podcasts for the podcast Listeners only - not on the radio. They are ruder and more risque than the usual show.A Dirty Book at Bedtime video podcast.The Head of ITV Entertainment Paul Jackson, criticizing listeners' ideas for TV programmes. It is unknown if he has bought any of the ideas."Mayor of On-Air" Phillip Elliott, a listener, was chosen to be the mayor of The Geoff Show. He had the 'civic duty' of opening their new website. He also made a speech at midnight just before 6 June 2006 (06/06/06, the so-called day of the Apocalypse).Danny Wallace visited the show, dispensing advice concerning Geoff's Gay God, since Danny started his own cult, by accident.Beetroot Watch Listeners email in where they have spotted beetroots in everyday life.The Geoff Show Turner Prize Similar to the real life Turner Prize, except judged purely on ideas for modern art.Essay Writing Contest Listeners were invited to compete in an essay-writing contest, 4 listeners in the end sent in 1000-word essays dissecting the lyrics of a song Annabel had mentioned one show, entitled the Pina Colada Song. Entries were judged on-air by Zoe Williams, a journalist, and Sean E Simmons from Truro was pronounced the winner.Apocalypse Watch On the eve of 6 June 2006 (06/06/06), listeners were invited to call the show to describe any out-of-the-ordinary events they had seen occur.Mop Gear A parody of Top Gear, competitors have to register the loudest noise on the decibelmeter in the studio, to win a menial prize.
Swedish band I'm From Barcelona appeared on the show on 24 January 2007, performing a two-song set in Virgin Radio's disabled toilet, after Geoff had pondered whether they could get into the Guinness Book of World Records by having the largest band perform in the smallest space. While it was not possible to claim the record (there is no regulation on the size of a disabled toilet), seventeen of the band's twenty nine members appeared on the show for an interview, before performing in the small space.
Chris Addison guested throughout the entire show on 3 July 2008.

Background MusicBeginning segment - The show usually starts with the song "Wigwam" which can be found on the Bob Dylan album Self Portrait from 1970.Show Opening Build-up - The background music, usually talked over by Geoff describing what is planned for the show, is an instrumental and backing-vocal only version of the 2007 video only release of "We're from Barcelona" by Swedish pop group I'm From BarcelonaThe Phone In (Pt. 1) - When the show members petition the audience for their experiences, the song in the background is "I Was Kaiser Bill's Batman", a track from 1967 by Whistling Jack Smith.The Phone In (Pt. 2) - While Annabelle reads out the responses from the listeners, the track Linus and Lucy as recorded by San Francisco jazz pianist Vince Guaraldi is heard. The song originally appeared in the TV special A Charlie Brown Christmas and was first released on the 1965 soundtrack record.The Big 'I Am...: - is backed by the 1984 Disco track "I Am What I Am" as released on the Gloria Gaynor album "I Am Gloria Gaynor".Annabelle's Letter: - is dictated over an instrumental version of the percolating song "Fashion Parade" from the Birmingham band Misty's Big Adventure.Last Orders - features the song "Angela" which was the theme for the TV show "Taxi" as recorded by Bob James.Porting Controversy - the Darth Vader theme from the Star Wars franchis played over this segment. It was once mentioned on the show that Annabel had been unaware of this fact for several years.

Running jokesGay God - A god 'for the new masses'. With Ten Gay Commandments.Geoff Show Novel - A novel written by listeners one sentence at a timeGeoff is Banksy - Geoff has repeatedly claimed to be the artist BanksyTypewriter Tip, Tip, Tip''' - Sometimes played when Annabel writes her letter. Geoff says "And how did you write that letter?" and Annabel would reply "On a Typewriter!" and they would play the music.

The final show (25 September 2008)

Phone in topics on the final show included:

"Did you ever catch your parents having or talking about sex"? 
"What weird way do you communicate with your pet(s)"? 
"Does your pet lead a double life"? "Shyness is nice..."

Porting controversy on the final show was entitled:

"The Beatles are really great".

As you can imagine what with Geoff being such a massive Beatles fan it was difficult for him to mutter the words "Well done Annabel! Good point, well made".

Drunk Versus Stoned on the final show was played by:

Drunk Gail in Staffordshire (1 point).
Stoned Tony in London (3½ points).

The results of the experiment were released, with the stoners winning by one.                                            
                                            

The return of "You Say It's Your Birthday, It's My Birthday Too, Yeah!".

Geoff with Nimla versus Richard.
Geoff (Nimla) = 2½ points
Richard = No points
Winner: Nimla.                                             
                                            

The return of "Let Bygones be Bygones".

To Prince Charles.                                            
                                            

The return of "The Dirty Book at Bedtime".

Book title: Sex in the Office.                                            
                                            

Nelsons Special Offer.

Sex Shop in Swanage, Dorset
SimplyPleasure.com - The Big Bang Bag. Spend over £30 you get a free bag full of various goodies. Such as lube, cockrings, batteries, gel, key rings and pens.

References

External links
AbsoluteRadio.co.uk - The Geoff Show
The Geoff Show Podcast
The Geoff Show on MySpace

2006 radio programme debuts